The Capitol, also known as The Capitol Department Store, is a historic department store building located at Fayetteville, Cumberland County, North Carolina. The original store was established at this site in 1921, with an existing two-story building incorporated into it in 1936. In 1949, the existing building was doubled in size by a large rear addition. It features marble facing, a recessed storefront, a large convex full-height window in the second story, and large aluminum script lettering for The Capitol. The Capitol, the last department store remaining in downtown Fayetteville, closed in March 1990.

It was listed on the National Register of Historic Places in 2005.

References

Defunct department stores based in North Carolina
Commercial buildings on the National Register of Historic Places in North Carolina
Modern Movement architecture in the United States
Buildings and structures completed in 1955
Buildings and structures in Fayetteville, North Carolina
National Register of Historic Places in Cumberland County, North Carolina
1955 establishments in North Carolina